Michael Gallagher (born 1930) is an author and translator of Japanese literature.  His translation of Yukio Mishima's Spring Snow was a finalist for the National Book Award in 1973, while his nonfiction work Laws of Heaven was the winner of the Alpha Sigma Nu Jesuit Book Award in Theology. As a Jesuit scholastic, he spent three years teaching English at St. Xavier High School in Cincinnati, Ohio, where he directed several plays, including The Teahouse of the August Moon. He left the Jesuit order and served briefly as a paratrooper in Korea.

Translations
Japan Sinks by Sakyo Komatsu
The Sea and Poison by Shusaku Endo
Spring Snow by Yukio Mishima
Runaway Horses by Yukio Mishima
The Pornographers by Akiyuki Nosaka

Books
Dust and Gingko Leaves (published in Japanese translation by Kodansha)
Laws of Heaven (1992)

References

1930 births
Living people
20th-century American translators
Japanese–English translators
American theologians
United States Army personnel of the Korean War
United States Army personnel
Former Jesuits
St. Xavier High School (Ohio) people